Beater may refer to:

Clothes
Beater (weaving), a tool used to force woven yarn into place
A shortening of "wifebeater" (shirt), a colloquialism for particular style of sleeveless shirt

Music
Any of various types of percussion mallets
 A rute
 The striking part of a Bass drum pedal
 The cipín used for playing the bodhrán

Fiction
A position in the fictional game of Quidditch from the Harry Potter series
Another name for Glamdring, Gandalf's sword, in J.R.R. Tolkien's The Hobbit
A name the main character Kirito, takes in the anime Sword Art Online

Technology
A machine used in papermaking
An attachment for a cooking mixer
Egg beater (disambiguation)
A jalopy, or by extension, a car meant for daily use and not for show

People with the surname 
 Bruno Beater (1914–1982), East German intelligence officer and politician

Other uses
A harp seal, that is approximately 3–4 weeks to one year of age
A beater in hunting, a person who drives game out of areas of cover by swinging sticks or flags
, a sealer wrecked by Hurricane Daisy in October 1962